The Life Before Her Eyes is a 2007 American thriller film directed by Vadim Perelman. The screenplay was adapted by Emil Stern from the Laura Kasischke novel of the same name. The film stars Uma Thurman and Evan Rachel Wood. It was released on April 18, 2008, and revolves around a survivor's guilt from a Columbine-like event that occurred 15 years previously, which causes her present-day idyllic life to fall apart.

Plot
Imaginative, impetuous, and wild Diana McFee (Evan Rachel Wood) cannot wait for her adult life to begin. While awaiting the final days of high school in the lush springtime, Diana tests her limits with sex and drugs as her more conservative friend Maureen (Eva Amurri) watches with concern. Then the two teens are involved in a Columbine-like shooting incident at their school and are forced to make an impossible choice.

The film mostly focuses on Diana's adulthood (Uma Thurman). She leads an apparently normal life as an art history university professor. She has a daughter, Emma (Gabrielle Brennan), and she is married to the professor who once gave a speech in her school about the power of visualization, how one can shape one's own future in this way.  However, Diana continues to feel guilty about something that does not let her sleep.

One day she gets a call from Emma's school, where the nuns running the school complain about Emma's behavior.  At an ice cream parlor, Diana asks Emma not to hide any more as she is always doing; Emma responds to her mother's reproaches with the claim that Diana hates her. They leave the parlor abruptly and as they are about to get into the car, Diana sees her husband with another woman. She hesitates about confronting him and instead remains in the middle of the street where she is hit by a pickup truck. On her way to the hospital she imagines that blood is escaping from her body.  In reality, she has not been hurt by the accident.  Instead, Diana is remembering the complications she had following an abortion in her high school days.

The day of the 15th anniversary of the shooting, a memorial is held at the school. Diana drives in front of the school several times until she finally decides to stop and bring in some flowers. As she enters the school she is asked whether she is one of the survivors. She smiles and walks inside, first leaving flowers on some desks and then moving on to the rest rooms where one of the shootings took place. At that moment she gets a call from Emma's school informing her that her daughter is missing and that a pink piece of clothing has been found in the woods. She drives there and walks through the woods, shouting out her daughter's name. Emma appears before Diana's eyes for a moment but then vanishes almost as soon as she has appeared.

It is revealed what occurred fifteen years earlier in the washroom where Diana left the flowers.  She and Maureen had been forced to decide who would survive when confronted by the shooter, Michael Patrick (John Magaro).  Though Maureen had offered herself first, the shooter questioned why Diana should not die.  In response, Diana agreed to be killed and was shot by Michael, who then killed himself.  At that moment, Diana dreamed the adult life she thought she would have if she let Maureen die and Emma was the child she would have had if she had not gone through the abortion.

At the anniversary, Diana is asked once again if she is a survivor.  She replies "No" with a smile, with a sense of relief that she did the right thing by dying and having her friend live her life.

Cast
 Uma Thurman as Diana McFee
 Evan Rachel Wood as young Diana McFee
 Eva Amurri as Maureen
 Brett Cullen as Paul McFee
 Gabrielle Brennan as Emma McFee
 Adam Chanler-Berat as Ryan Haswhip
 Oscar Isaac as Marcus
 Maggie Lacey as Amanda
 Nathalie Paulding as young Amanda
 Jewel Donohue as Mother
 Tanner Max Cohen as Nate Witt
 Lynn Cohen as Sister Beatrice
 John Magaro as Michael Patrick
 Molly Price as Diana's mother
 Isabel Keating as Maureen's mother
 Mike Slater as young Tom
 Anna Moore as Blonde Student
 Melissa Heaton student

Reception
The Life Before Her Eyes received a generally negative response; as of May 2019, Rotten Tomatoes reported that 23% of critics had given the film positive reviews, based on 94 reviews – with the consensus being the film is "Despite earnest performances, Life Before Her Eyes is a confusing, painfully overwrought melodrama." Metacritic reported the film had an average score of 32 out of 100, based on 15 reviews.

Box office
The film opened in limited release on April 18, 2008, in the United States and grossed $20,220 in eight theaters its opening weekend, averaging $2,527 per theater. As of Jun 27–29, 2008, it had a domestic total gross of $303,439, and a production budget of $13 million.

References

External links
 
 
 
 
 
 

2007 films
2000s thriller drama films
2007 independent films
American thriller drama films
Films about school violence
Films based on American novels
Films shot in Connecticut
American independent films
Films scored by James Horner
2007 drama films
Films directed by Vadim Perelman
Magnolia Pictures films
2000s English-language films
2000s American films